King's Highway 25, commonly referred to as Highway 25, was a highway in the Canadian province of Ontario. The north–south route connected several towns on its route northward from Burlington. The first section of Highway 25, designated in 1925, travelled north from Highway 5 to Milton. In 1928, the route was extended south into Burlington, following portions of Lower Middle Road to Highway 2. The highway was extended north to Highway 7 in 1937. That same year, a portion of Highway 25 was made concurrent with The Middle Road, which would be renamed as the Queen Elizabeth Way (QEW) two years later. The route remained relatively unchanged for two decades, save for the southern end being truncated at the QEW in 1946. In 1963 it was extended north to Ospringe to meet Highway 24. Another extension was added in 1974 to bring the route to Highway 89 near Shelburne. The entire route was decommissioned in 1997 and 1998 as part of a province-wide downloading of highways deemed to be of regional importance.

Route description 
At the time of its decommissioning, Highway 25 began at an interchange with the QEW, at Exit 111; however, it originally continued south to Highway 2 (Lakeshore Road) at Bronte. It travelled along the eastern edge of Bronte Creek Provincial Park north to Highway 5 (Dundas Street) at Palermo, bearing the local name of Bronte Road. Today, the route encounters an interchange with Highway 407, Exit 13, just north of Dundas Street, though the toll highway wasn't yet built in the area at the time Highway 25 was decommissioned. The route continued north into Milton as Ontario Street, jogging westward for a short distance along Steeles Avenue before resuming a northward course along Martin Street.

Immediately north of Steeles Ave., Highway 25 encountered an interchange with Highway 401, Exit 320. It passed through the rolling hillside of Halton Hills into the community of Acton, where it encountered Highway 7. The two highways travelled concurrently through Acton, after which Highway 7 branched westerly to Guelph. North of Acton, the highway crossed between the Regional Municipality of Halton and Wellington County and continued to Ospringe, meeting Highway 24 and becoming concurrent with it for the next  eastward to Brisbane.

At Brisbane, Highway 24 continued east while Highway 25 branched north to Highway 9, encountering it midway between Arthur and Orangeville. It then turned west concurrent with Highway 9 for  before turning north into Grand Valley. North of that town, it continued through rolling farmland before ending at Highway 89 west of Shelburne.

History 
The history of Highway 25 dates back to 1925 when the Department of Public Highways, predecessor to the Ministry of Transportation of Ontario (MTO), assumed control of the Halton County road between Palermo (since amalgamated into a neighbourhood of Oakville) and Milton on April 14, 1925.
On August 22, 1928, the route was extended to Highway 2 (King Road) in Burlington via Guelph Line and the Lower Middle Road,
the latter which would soon be incorporated into the QEW. This established a  concurrency with Highway 5 between Nelson and Palermo.
In 1937, Highway 25 was extended north to Highway 7 when the renamed Department of Highways (DHO) assumed the Milton to Acton Road. This short extension was established on August 25, 1937.

When the new divided highway opened in 1937, the Highway 25 designation was retained for a number of years. However, in 1946 the southern end of the highway was truncated at the QEW–Guelph Line interchange.

The route remained unchanged for nearly 20 years, until 1963.
On April 1, 1970, the southern end of the highway was rerouted. The section along Guelph Line was decommissioned and the concurrency with Highway 5 was removed. A new direct routing south to the QEW along Bronte Road was established.
A concurrency with Highway 24 was established east of Ospringe to Trafalgar Road, which the route followed north to Highway 9. The entire route of Highway 104 became part of Highway 25, and a concurrency with Highway 9 created.

However, provincial budget cuts under the Mike Harris government resulted in the removal of Highway 25 from the highway system during mass highway transfers performed in 1997 and 1998. On April 1, 1997, the section from the QEW to Highway 401 and the section north of Ospringe was decommissioned.
This was followed several months later when the remainder of the highway was decommissioned on January 1, 1998.

Major intersections

References 

025